The IBM PC Convertible (model 5140) is a laptop computer made by IBM, first sold in April 1986. The Convertible was IBM's first laptop-style computer, following the luggable IBM Portable, and introduced the 3½-inch floppy disk format to the IBM product line. Like modern laptops, it featured power management and the ability to run from batteries.

It was replaced in 1991 by the IBM PS/2 L40 SX, and in Japan by the IBM Personal System/55note, the predecessor to the ThinkPad.

Predecessors
IBM had been working on a laptop for some time before the Convertible. In 1983, work was underway on a laptop similar to the Tandy Model 100, codenamed "Sweetpea," but it was rejected by Don Estridge for not being PC compatible. Another attempt in 1984 produced the "P-14" prototype machine, but it failed to pass IBM's human factors tests, especially after poor public reception of the display in the competing Data General-One.

Description
The PC Convertible came in three models: PC Convertible, PC Convertible Model 2 and PC Convertible Model 3. The latter two were released in October 1987 and are primarily distinguished by their LCD panels. The original Convertible used a non-backlit panel which was considered difficult to read. The Model 2 lacked a backlight as well but upgraded to an improved supertwist panel, and the Model 3 included a backlight. The other hardware specifications are largely the same for all three models.

The CPU is an Intel 80C88, the CMOS version of the Intel 8088 CPU. It weighed just over 12 pounds and featured a built-in carrying handle, with a battery rated for 10 hours (4 hours in the backlit Model 3).

The LCD screen displayed  characters, but has a very wide aspect ratio, so text characters and graphics are compressed vertically, appearing half their normal height.

The PC Convertible has expansion capabilities through a proprietary ISA-based port on the rear of the machine. Extension modules, including a small printer and a video output module, were provided as plastic modules that snap into place. The machine can also take an internal modem, but has no room for an internal hard disk. The concept and the design of the body was made by German industrial designer Richard Sapper.

Pressing the power button on the computer does not turn it off, but puts the machine into "suspend" mode, which will hold the machine's state as long as battery power lasts, to save on boot time. The CMOS 80C88 CPU has a static core, which holds its state indefinitely by stopping the system clock oscillator, and can resume processing when the clock signal is restarted as long as it is kept powered. The system RAM in the Convertible is SRAM rather than DRAM, both for lower power consumption and less circuitry to fit into the cramped laptop case.

Pressing a lever between the two floppy drives just below the display detaches the entire screen from the unit. This feature allows the use of a full-size desktop monitor while at one's desk, an early forerunner of the "docking station" concept, and similar to Apple's PowerBook Duo.

Reception
The machine had difficulty in the marketplace and was seen as a poor value for money, since other laptops in the market had more built-in features, although it enjoyed some success with business users, who saw its battery life and portability as selling points. Even after the release of the Model 3 in October 1987, which fixed some of the machine's issues, lack of built-in features remained a pain point. The parallel, serial and video ports all required adapters, while competing machines included these as integrated features. The Convertible was heavy, not much faster than the Portable it replaced, had no traditional PC expansion ports (such as serial ports and a parallel port) without an add-on, and had a hard-to-read, oddly-shaped LCD screen. It also competed against faster portables based on the Intel 80286 that offered optional hard drives, from companies such as Compaq, and laptops from companies such as Toshiba and Zenith that were lighter and offered similar specifications, sometimes at half the price. The keyboard was also criticized for lacking several important keys.

See also

 IBM Portable Personal Computer
 IBM PS/2 L40SX
 IBM PS/55note
 History of laptops
 Convertible (computer)

References

External links
 
 
 IBM-5140 Convertible and collection of old digital and analog computers at oldcomputermuseum.com
 

5140 Convertible
5140 Convertible
Computer-related introductions in 1986